Kenni Burns (born November 24, 1983) is an American college football coach and former player. He is the head coach for the Kent State Golden Flashes football team and the former running backs coach and assistant head coach for Minnesota Golden Gophers football.

Playing career
Burns was a three-year letter winner at Indiana. He as a played running back from 2003 to 2006.

Coaching career

Minnesota 
Burns followed P. J. Fleck from Western Michigan to Minnesota 2017, as the running back coach. In 2019, he was granted the additional title as Assistant head coach. During his tenure, Burns coached Rodney Smith and all-American back Mohamed Ibrahim.

Kent State
On December 14, 2022, Burns was named the head coach for the Kent State Golden Flashes.

Personal life
Burns is from Springfield, Illinois. He graduated from Sacred Heart-Griffin High School in 2003 and attended Indiana University Bloomington where he graduated with a degree in general studies in 2006.

Burns and his wife, Ciara, have two children.

References

External links
 Kent State profile

1983 births
Living people
American football running backs
Indiana Hoosiers football players
Kent State Golden Flashes football coaches
Millersville Marauders football coaches
Minnesota Golden Gophers football coaches
North Dakota State Bison football coaches
Southern Illinois Salukis football coaches
Western Michigan Broncos football coaches
People from Springfield, Illinois
Coaches of American football from Illinois
Players of American football from Illinois
African-American coaches of American football
African-American players of American football
21st-century African-American sportspeople